Waipapa is a small town in the Bay of Islands, Northland, New Zealand. It is around 10 minutes drive from Kerikeri, the nearest urban centre to Waipapa, located on State Highway 10. Waipapa itself has no school and most people travel into Kerikeri on a daily basis. It is governed by the Far North District council.

Demographics
Statistics New Zealand describes Waipapa as a rural settlement. The settlement is part of the larger Waipapa statistical area.

Waipapa settlement had a population of 174 at the 2018 New Zealand census, an increase of 3 people (1.8%) since the 2013 census, and an increase of 45 people (34.9%) since the 2006 census. There were 51 households, comprising 81 males and 93 females, giving a sex ratio of 0.87 males per female. The median age was 28.1 years (compared with 37.4 years nationally), with 57 people (32.8%) aged under 15 years, 42 (24.1%) aged 15 to 29, 60 (34.5%) aged 30 to 64, and 21 (12.1%) aged 65 or older.

Ethnicities were 65.5% European/Pākehā, 46.6% Māori, 5.2% Pacific peoples, 10.3% Asian, and 3.4% other ethnicities. People may identify with more than one ethnicity.

Although some people chose not to answer the census's question about religious affiliation, 55.2% had no religion, 34.5% were Christian, 1.7% were Hindu and 3.4% had Māori religious beliefs.

Of those at least 15 years old, 12 (10.3%) people had a bachelor's or higher degree, and 27 (23.1%) people had no formal qualifications. The median income was $26,300, compared with $31,800 nationally. 9 people (7.7%) earned over $70,000 compared to 17.2% nationally. The employment status of those at least 15 was that 57 (48.7%) people were employed full-time, 18 (15.4%) were part-time, and 9 (7.7%) were unemployed.

Waipapa statistical area

Waipapa statistical area had a population of 870 at the 2018 New Zealand census, an increase of 156 people (21.8%) since the 2013 census, and an increase of 333 people (62.0%) since the 2006 census. There were 288 households, comprising 426 males and 444 females, giving a sex ratio of 0.96 males per female. The median age was 37.0 years (compared with 37.4 years nationally), with 210 people (24.1%) aged under 15 years, 165 (19.0%) aged 15 to 29, 381 (43.8%) aged 30 to 64, and 117 (13.4%) aged 65 or older.

Ethnicities were 86.2% European/Pākehā, 23.8% Māori, 2.8% Pacific peoples, 4.5% Asian, and 2.1% other ethnicities. People may identify with more than one ethnicity.

The percentage of people born overseas was 19.3, compared with 27.1% nationally.

Although some people chose not to answer the census's question about religious affiliation, 64.8% had no religion, 24.5% were Christian, 1.0% had Māori religious beliefs, 1.0% were Hindu, 0.7% were Buddhist and 1.4% had other religions.

Of those at least 15 years old, 84 (12.7%) people had a bachelor's or higher degree, and 123 (18.6%) people had no formal qualifications. The median income was $31,600, compared with $31,800 nationally. 102 people (15.5%) earned over $70,000 compared to 17.2% nationally. The employment status of those at least 15 was that 336 (50.9%) people were employed full-time, 117 (17.7%) were part-time, and 24 (3.6%) were unemployed.

Features

Airport
The nearest airport to Waipapa is the Kerikeri Airport, which serves all of the Bay of Islands.

Business
Most businesses in Waipapa are located on State Highway 10, with the biggest store, The Warehouse, located on Klinac Lane.

The business area of Waipapa is expanding rapidly. It now contains over 120 retail, service, commercial and light industrial businesses in the Waipapa shopping area.

Culture
Waipapa's local Māori iwi is the Ngapuhi. One of the roads in Waipapa is named Ngapuhi Road.

Water features
Waipapa, being inland, has no beaches, but does have a landing named after the Waipapa Stream which runs just to the north of it where it meets the Kerikeri Inlet, close to Kerikeri's Stone Store. To the south of Waipapa runs the Kerikeri River, on which is the popular Rainbow Falls.

References

External links
 Waipapa's website.

Populated places in the Northland Region
Far North District